Perum Pulli is a 1991 Indian Tamil-language film written and directed by Vikraman, starring Babu and Suman Ranganathan. It was released on 14 January 1991.

Plot 

Perum Pulli is the story of an innocent youth and his love for his mother.

Cast 
Babu
Suman Ranganathan

Soundtrack 
Soundtrack was composed by S. A. Rajkumar. Palani Bharathi was introduced as lyricist in this film.

Reception 
N. Krishnaswamy of The Indian Express wrote, "Directed by Vikraman who made Pudhu Vasantham and made name for himself [..] Perum Pulli has a hash of a story".

References

External links 
 

1990s Tamil-language films
1991 films
Films scored by S. A. Rajkumar
Super Good Films films